Portugal competed at the 1936 Summer Olympics in Berlin, Germany.

A delegation of nineteen competitors participated in five sports, with the equestrian team winning a bronze medal, Portugal's third since 1912.

Medalists

Bronze
 Domingos de Sousa Coutinho, José Beltrão and Luís Mena e Silva — Equestrian, Team Jumping.

Athletics

Men's Marathon
 Manuel Dias — 17th (2:49.00,0)
 Jaime Mendes — DNF

Equestrian

Men's Individual Jumping
 Domingos de Sousa Coutinho — 16th (20 faults)
 José Beltrão — 6th (12 faults)
 Luís Mena e Silva — 21st (24 faults)

Men's Team Jumping
 Domingos de Sousa Coutinho, José Beltrão and Luís Mena e Silva — 3rd

Fencing

Five fencers, all men, represented Portugal in 1936.

Men's épée
 Gustavo Carinhas — 1st round: 3rd (poule 6)
 Henrique da Silveira — 6th
 Paulo d'Eça Leal — semi-final: 9th (poule 1)

Men's team épée
 Gustavo Carinhas, António Mascarenhas de Menezes, Henrique da Silveira, João Sassetti and Paulo d'Eça Leal — semi-final: 5th - 8th (poule 2)

Sailing

Men's Olympic Monotype
 Ernesto Vieira de Mendonça — 21st (62 points)

Men's Star
 Joaquim Mascarenhas de Fiúza and António Guedes de Herédia — 10th (28 points)

Shooting

Men's 25m Rapid Fire Pistol (60 shots)
 Alberto Andressen — 1st round
 Joaquim da Mota — 1st round
 Carlos Queiroz — 1st round

Men's 50m Pistol (60 shots)
 Moysés Cardoso — 40th (490 rings)

Men's 50m Rifle Prone (60 shots)
 Carlos Queiroz — 11th (292 rings)
 Francisco António Real — 19th (283 rings)
 Eduardo Santos — 10th (293 rings)

Officials
 César de Melo (chief of mission)
 António Mascarenhas de Menezes (fencing)
 Manuel da Costa Latino (equestrian)
 R. I. de Noronha (fencing)

References

External links
Official Olympic Reports
International Olympic Committee results database

Nations at the 1936 Summer Olympics
1936 Summer Olympics
1936 in Portuguese sport